The pattern suburban E class tank loco was built by Kitson & Co of Leeds, England, in 1888 and was a typical British tank engine of the 2-4-2 wheel arrangement. The original loco, named "Tasmania" by the builder, was displayed in the Centennial International Exhibition in the Melbourne Exhibition Buildings in 1888.

There were seventy-one engines in the class, numbered 426 (pattern engine), 346 to 394 (even numbers, Phoenix Foundry), 12, 34, 36, 428 to 460 (even numbers, Phoenix Foundry) and 472 to 520 (even numbers, David Munro).

Five additional engines were delivered from Phoenix as EE class 462, 464, 466, 468 and 470, with a new wheel arrangement of 0-6-2T explicitly for shunting use. Following their evaluation, engines 482 and 496 in 1898, followed by 490 and 478 in 1906-1907, were converted to the same format although the latter two used 170psi boilers and 18-inch cylinders in lieu of the earlier 140psi boilers and 17-inch cylinders.

The pattern engine was withdrawn in 1915, and two further units in 1917.

As Melbourne's suburban electrification project progressed the 2-4-2 tank engines were quickly rendered obsolete. In the period 1919-1923, 20 engines were converted to match the nine existing shunters' 0-6-2T configuration (all bar 494 upgraded to 18-inch cylinders), while a further 25 were withdrawn. Of the latter group, twenty were sold to the South Australian Railways to become their second M class. An additional 18 engines were withdrawn in 1924, leaving only a single 2-4-2T type in service.

In the 1923 locomotive renumbering scheme the EE class engines were reclassified in the 350-379 group. By 1929 this had expanded to 390 and the group was reclassified E.

The original E class 2-4-2T type engines were intended to take numbers 236-245 without a class letter, but as above only one engine survived long enough to have the new number applied; thus 506 became 236.

Class table

Retirements and preservation
E359 was the first of the 0-6-2T type engines taken off register in November 1937 but the others remained on register until the 1950s, with six lasting into the early 1960s.

The last original engine, No.236, was retained as a shunter at Newport Workshops until its withdrawal in 1953. It was then stored for almost a decade until being allocated to the then-newly-established ARHS Railway Museum in Newport, Victoria as one of their first display pieces.

The last two in service, numbers 369 and 371, finished their working lives as yard pilots at Newport Workshops until 1972, when they were retired. E369 was allocated to the ARHS for static display at the Newport Railway Museum, while attempts were made in the 1980s to restore E371, initially at Steamrail's tarp shop facility and later at the Spotswood reclamation depot. However, the engine was found to have taken significant damage during its career, including damage to the frame and boiler that would be prohibitively expensive to rectify; in short, it would likely be cheaper to construct a new locomotive from scratch. Given that, E371 was cosmetically reassembled and transferred to the Victorian Goldfields Railway (VGR). It is now a static display outside Maldon station.

References

External links
 Victorian Preserved Steam Locomotives detailed information about all surviving ex-VR steam locos.
 Diagram of 2-4-2T E class locomotive
 Diagram of 0-6-2T EE class locomotive
 Picture of E 446
 EE 371
 E 446 Side view
 E 250
 EE 494
 E 480
 E 512
 E-class locomotive at Korong Vale

E class
2-4-2T locomotives
0-6-2T locomotives
Kitson locomotives
Railway locomotives introduced in 1888
Broad gauge locomotives in Australia